A-sharp, A or A# may refer to:

 A-sharp major, enharmonic to B-flat major
 A-sharp minor
 A♯ (musical note), musical pitch
A Sharp (.NET), a port of the Ada programming language to the .NET environment
A Sharp (Axiom), a programming language for the Axiom computer algebra system